Vitaly Koryakin (born December 2, 1983) is a male freestyle wrestler from Tajikistan. He participated in Men's freestyle 60 kg at 2008 Summer Olympics. He was eliminated in 1/8 final by Kenichi Yumoto from Japan.

External links

 Wrestler bio on beijin2008.com

Living people
1983 births
Olympic wrestlers of Tajikistan
Tajikistani male sport wrestlers
Wrestlers at the 2008 Summer Olympics
Wrestlers at the 2010 Asian Games
Asian Games competitors for Tajikistan
21st-century Tajikistani people